The history of warning labels in the United States began in 1938 when the United States Congress passed a law mandating that food products have a list of ingredients on the label.  

In 1966 the Federal government mandated that cigarette packs have a warning on them from the surgeon general. However, no pictures because they didn't really want people to stop buying from a multi billion dollar industry. See Tobacco packaging warning messages. Congress voted in 1973 that products containing “toxic substances” must have labels. In 1985 there was a testimony that wanted record companies to put labels on music that contained sexual or violent lyrics. On March 29, 1990 warning labels were put on music products that contained potentially offensive lyrics; this was done with the agreement of the recording companies. In 1989, alcohol was required to have their surgeon general’s warning.  

Several federal agencies are involved in the business of warning-labels, including the Consumer Product Safety Commission, the Food and Drug Administration, and the Federal Bureau of Investigation. FBI warning labels have been appeared since 1975 in rented movies warning people about video piracy.

Types of warning labels 

There are three levels of warning, CAUTION, WARNING and DANGER:
Caution indicates a potentially hazardous situation that, if not avoided, may result in minor or moderate injury.
Warning indicates a potentially hazardous situation that, if not avoided, could result in death or serious injury. 
Danger indicates an imminently hazardous situation that, if not avoided, will result in death or serious injury.  This word is limited to the use in the most extreme situations.

See also 
 Warning label

References 

Ryas Van J., Meyer V.,& Sebranek P. (2006) The Business Writer. Boston
Charleston, Peter. "Hey, the labels are kind of stupid, but don't say they didn't try to warn you", The Seattle Times,November 6, 2006. Accessed February 23, 2008

Warning labels
Labels
Warning systems

External links